Garry Scott (born 24 February 1954) is a former Australian rules footballer who played with South Melbourne in the Victorian Football League (VFL).

Notes

External links 

Living people
1954 births
Australian rules footballers from Victoria (Australia)
Sydney Swans players